Walecki or Wałecki may refer to:

Henryk Walecki, Polish inter-war communist activist
Wałcz County (powiat wałecki), an administrative division in NW Poland